Events from the year 1615 in Quebec.

Events
The first Récollets, a French branch of the Franciscans arrive in Quebec. They have been invited by Lieutenant General Samuel de Champlain to strengthen the religious life in the colony of New France.
Following the arrival of the Récollets in New France, the first ever mass is being celebrated on the island of Montreal.
Champlain and two other French colonists, one of whom is probably Étienne Brûlé, leaves the colony to journey inland in the company of the Wendat, an allied First Nation tribe. They reach Lake Simcoe and later split up. Near Oneida Lake, the French and Wendat are involved in a combat with the Iroquois, the traditional First Nation enemy of the Wendat and the French. de Champlain is injured in the battle.

Births

Deaths

References

1610s in Canada
Quebec, 1615 In
Years in Quebec